is a 1953 Japanese comedy-drama film directed by Mikio Naruse.

Plot
Because her brother's future wife will soon move into the family's house, Kikuko and her husband Isaku are forced to look for a new room. They move into the house of Isaku's colleague Ryota, who has just lost his wife. Kikuko and the spontaneous, emotional Ryota develop an affection for each other, much to the concern of the rather detached, distanced Isaku. Kikuko and Isaku finally move into a new room whose landlady only accepts tenants without children. When Kikuko admits to her husband that she is pregnant, he tries to talk her into having an abortion. Kikuko first gives in, but eventually refuses, and Isaku agrees to have the child, even if their decision will make things difficult for them.

Cast
Yōko Sugi as Kikuko
Ken Uehara as Isaku
Rentarō Mikuni as Ryota
Keiju Kobayashi as Shigekichi, Kikuko's brother
Mariko Okada as Kumiko, Kikuko's sister
Kamatari Fujiwara as Kikuko's father
Hisako Takihana as Kikuko's mother
Chieko Nakakita as Mrs. Akamatsu
Eiko Miyoshi as landlady

Background
Like other Naruse films from this period, such as Repast and Wife, the theme of Husband and Wife involves a couple trapped with each other, and, another recurring motif in the director's films, a character is forced to redefine oneself and test his/her strength. Husband and Wife was Yōko Sugi's only starring role in a Naruse film, playing a part that had originally been intended for Setsuko Hara.

Reception
Slant Magazine critic Keith Uhlich awarded Husband and Wife 3.5/4 stars, describing it as a "what if" scenario, specifically, "what if Charlie Chaplin and Buster Keaton were locked together in a room and forced to fight over Mary Pickford?", a parallel which becomes explicit in a scene where the protagonists visit a stage show reenactment of a Chaplin routine. According to Uhlich, the film's theme is the journey towards "reconciliation of those contradictions inherent to being human."

References

External links

1953 films
1953 comedy-drama films
Japanese comedy-drama films
Films directed by Mikio Naruse
Films produced by Sanezumi Fujimoto
Toho films
Films scored by Ichirō Saitō
Japanese black-and-white films
1950s Japanese films